The Hydropsychoidea are a superfamily of caddisflies.

Trichoptera
Insect superfamilies